The Muscatine Community School District (MCSD) is located in Muscatine, Iowa, serving almost all of the city and the surrounding rural areas, including the unincorporated areas of Fairport and Montpelier.

The district consists of six elementary (K-5) schools, two middle (6-8) schools, Muscatine High School (9-12) and one alternative program, East Campus.  In 2005, Madison Elementary received the National Blue Ribbon School designation, an award which was subsequently given to McKinley Elementary in 2010 and to Washington Elementary in 2011.  Muscatine Community is the only district in Iowa to have three blue ribbon schools in this time period.

History 

In July 2019, Jerry Riibe announced his resignation as superintendent.  January 24, 2020, the district announced the hiring of Clint Christopher as superintendent, beginning July 1, 2020.  Christopher has been the superintendent of Eastern Carver County School District in Chaska, Minn., since 2017. Before that, he was associate superintendent in the district.

Schools
The district operates ten schools, all in Muscatine:

 Pre-K
 Muskie Early Learning Center
 Elementary (K-5)
 Franklin Elementary School
 Grant Elementary School
 Jefferson Elementary School
 Madison Elementary School
 McKinley Elementary School
 Mulberry Elementary School
 Middle Schools (6-8)
 Susan Clark Junior High
 Central Middle School
 High School (9-12)
 Muscatine High School

See also 
 Clark v. Board of School Directors
 List of school districts in Iowa

References

External links
 Muscatine Community School District

School districts in Iowa
Education in Muscatine County, Iowa